Sambadrome is the name given to an exhibition place for the Samba schools parades during Carnaval in Brazil. A sambadrome generally consists of tiered spectator viewing areas surrounding a long alley for the schools to parade down.

Sambadromes in Brazilian state capitals

Other cities

See also
 Torcida Jovem

External links
 Torcida Jovem of Santos FC School of Samba